Wola Libertowska  is a village in the administrative district of Gmina Żarnowiec, within Zawiercie County, Silesian Voivodeship, in southern Poland.

References

Wola Libertowska